Glasgow is the largest city in Scotland, a constituent country of the United Kingdom.

Glasgow City may also refer to:
Glasgow City (council area), a unitary district established in 1996
Glasgow City Council, the local authority body in the city
City of Glasgow (1975–1996), a district of Strathclyde from 1975 to 1996
Glasgow city centre, its main business district 
Glasgow City Region, a functional region centred around the city
Glasgow City F.C., a professional women's football club
Greater Glasgow, the term for the larger urban area around the city

See also
Glasgow (disambiguation)